In the French Style is a 1963 French-American romance film released by Columbia Pictures directed by Robert Parrish and stars Jean Seberg, Stanley Baker and Philippe Forquet. It was based on a short story by Irwin Shaw.

Plot
The young American student Christina James (Jean Seberg) comes to Paris to live in the art scene. After six months in Paris, she meets sixteen-year-old Guy (Philippe Forquet) at a crowded gallery showing and their romance develops. Later, she enjoys encounters with European men. Her Chicago-based history professor father (Addison Powell) cautions her about fleeting love. She abandons a long-time attachment to a British international journalist (Stanley Baker) to marry the San Francisco, California, surgeon Dr. John Haislip (James Leo Herlihy).

Cast
 Jean Seberg — Christina James 
 Stanley Baker — Walter Beddoes 
 Philippe Forquet — Guy 
 Addison Powell — Mr. James, Christina's Father 
 Jack Hedley — Bill Norton 
 Maurice Teynac — Baron Edward de Chassier 
 James Leo Herlihy — Dr. John Haislip 
 Ann Lewis — Stephanie Morell 
 Jacques Charon — Patrini 
 Claudine Auger — Clio Andropolous 
 Barbara Sommers — Madame Piguet
 Moustache — Cafe owner

References

External links

1963 films
French romance films
Films directed by Robert Parrish
Columbia Pictures films
Films with screenplays by Irwin Shaw
Films set in Paris
English-language French films
1960s English-language films
American romance films
1960s American films
1960s French films